Patrick Galbraith (born April 16, 1967) is an American former doubles world No. 1 tennis player.

Career
A doubles specialist, Galbraith reached the World No. 1 doubles ranking in 1993. During his career he won 38 top-level doubles titles. He was a mixed doubles champion at the US Open in 1994 (partnering Elna Reinach) and 1996 (partnering Lisa Raymond). He also won the men's doubles title at the ATP Tour World Championships in 1995 (partnering Grant Connell). He was a men's doubles runner-up at Wimbledon in both 1993 and 1994, and a mixed doubles runner-up at French Open in 1997. He retired from the professional tour in 1999, having won prize money totalling US$2,684,136.

Prior to turning professional, Galbraith played tennis for UCLA from 1986 to 1989, where he was a three-time All-American and an NCAA doubles champion in 1988.

In November 2018 Gabraith was elected as chairman of the board and president of the United States Tennis Association (USTA), succeeding Katrina Adams.

Career finals

Doubles (36 titles, 19 runner-ups)

Doubles performance timeline

References

External links 
 
 
 

1967 births
Living people
American male tennis players
Tennis people from Washington (state)
UCLA Bruins men's tennis players
US Open (tennis) champions
Grand Slam (tennis) champions in mixed doubles
ATP number 1 ranked doubles tennis players